Thimbleby or Thymbleby may refer to:

 Thimbleby, Lincolnshire, England
 Thimbleby, North Yorkshire, England
 Thimbleby's Tower, Chester, Cheshire, England

 Thimbleby (surname)